Alfredson is a surname. Notable people with the surname include:

Daniel Alfredson (born 1959), Swedish film director
Hans Alfredson (1931–2017), Swedish actor, film director, writer and comedian
Hawk Alfredson (born 1960), Swedish artist
Tomas Alfredson (born 1965), Swedish film director

See also
Alfredsson